Alan Howarth may refer to:

Alan Howarth, Baron Howarth of Newport, British politician
Alan Howarth (composer), soundtrack composer